Vladimir Shemetov (born 9 March 1964) is a former backstroke swimmer from the Soviet Union. He competed at the boycotted 1980 Summer Olympics in Moscow, USSR, and won two silver medals at the 1981 European Championships in Split.

References
 

1964 births
Living people
Russian male swimmers
Soviet male swimmers
Male backstroke swimmers
Swimmers at the 1980 Summer Olympics
Olympic swimmers of the Soviet Union
World Aquatics Championships medalists in swimming
European Aquatics Championships medalists in swimming
Universiade medalists in swimming
Universiade silver medalists for the Soviet Union
Medalists at the 1983 Summer Universiade